Cân i Gymru (English: A Song for Wales) is a Welsh television show broadcast on S4C annually. It was first introduced in 1969 when BBC Cymru wanted to enter the Eurovision Song Contest. The winner of the contest represents Wales at the annual Pan Celtic Festival held in Ireland and is also awarded a cash prize (which varies from year to year).

History

Cân i Gymru was presented to Wales under the name Cân Disc a Dawn, a competition based around the Welsh language pop music show  (as seen on Victor Lewis Smith's TV Offal), for the first time in 1969. At the time, Meredydd Evans, head of light entertainment at BBC Cymru Wales, hoped that the winning song would be able to compete in the Eurovision Song Contest, although the BBC in London decided in the end that only one song from Britain would compete.

Eight programmes were broadcast in the series to select a Song for Wales with seven songs in each, performed by well-known singers of the time. The public voted by sending in letters and the song with the most votes went through to the final. The last programme was broadcast on 5 June 1969 throughout Britain on BBC1 under the title Song for Wales and was presented by Ronnie Williams in Welsh and English. A panel then chose the winning song on the night. The programme was also part of the BBC's provision for the Investiture of Prince Charles which would take place on 1 July 1969.

Following the establishment of the Pan Celtic Festival in Ireland in the early 1970's the Festival's Wales Committee started the Cân i Gymru competition once again in order to choose a song to represent Wales in the Celtavision competition. There was no competition in 1973. Initially the media in Wales did not have much interest in the competition. Cân i Gymru was not broadcast live on television, and a panel voted to choose the winners. For example the 1980 competition was held at Bar Cefn yr Angel in Aberystwyth and was broadcast on BBC Radio Cymru.

By 1982 the competition was back on television but a panel still chose the winner. The winning song is now chosen by a vote where members of the public phone for their favorite song. In 2019, the prize was £5,000 with £2,000 for second place and £1,000 for third place. The winner has the opportunity to go on to compete in Celtavision, held in Ireland as part of the Pan Celtic Festival.

Unlike the majority of singing competitions in Europe, the emphasis is on the composer of the song rather than the performer. A compilation album was released in 2005 by Welsh record label Sain containing all the tracks that won the competition from its inception in 1969 to 2005. This was followed by individual compilation albums for the 2006 and 2007 competitions, both of which were released by TPF Records.

Winners by year

Hostings

See also 

 ABU Song Festivals
 Bundesvision Song Contest
 Caribbean Song Festival
 Eurovision Dance Contest
 Eurovision Song Contest
 Eurovision Young Dancers
 Eurovision Young Musicians
 Intervision Song Contest
 Junior Eurovision Song Contest
 OGAE
 OGAE Second Chance Contest
 OGAE Video Contest
 Sopot International Song Festival
 Turkvision Song Contest

References

External links
 
 

 
1960s Welsh television series
1969 British television series debuts
1970s Welsh television series
1980s Welsh television series
1990s Welsh television series
2000s Welsh television series
2010s Welsh television series
2020s Welsh television series
Annual events in Wales
British music television shows
Music competitions in the United Kingdom
S4C original programming
Singing competitions
Song contests
Welsh-language music
Welsh-language television shows
Welsh television shows
BBC Cymru Wales television shows
Television shows produced by Harlech Television (HTV)